Johannes Helstone, born Nicodemus Johannes Helstone (11 January 1853 – 24 April 1927), was a Surinamese composer, pianist and writer. He is best known for his 1906 opera Het Pand der Goden.

Biography
Helstone was born on the Moravian mission Berg en Dal on 11 January 1853. He was named Nicodemus Johannes Helstone, but used the name Johannes or Johannes Nicolaas. At the age of 14, he was sent to Paramaribo for a teaching degree. His musical talents were noted by Heinrich Williger, the head teacher, who arranged that he could continue his studies at the Royal Conservatory of Music of Leipzig. In 1894, Helstone graduated cum laude.

Helstone received several offers to work abroad, but decided to return to Suriname. Musically, he was active as a composer, pianist, and organist. Professionally, Helstone was a teacher, and a church organist. 

In 1899, his unpublished compositions and two pianos were lost in a fire.

Musical career
In 1906, Helstone wrote the opera Het Pand der Goden. The opera received positive reviews in Suriname. He translated the opera to German, and toured Germany, France and Austria where the opera was well received. Helstone received several job offers which he declined.

Other musical works include psalms, a mazurka brillante (1889), a toccata, Prinses Juliana Mars (1903) in honour of the birth of Princess Juliana, Emancipatie Mars (1913) and many songs in Dutch and German.

Other work
In 1903, Helstone wrote a book about the grammar of Sranan Tongo, the English-based Creole spoken in Suriname. The book is slightly controversial, because Helstone encouraged the Creole population to learn Dutch. In 1924 and 1925, Helstone wrote a five parts series about proverbs in Sranan Tongo. The proverbs are translated in Dutch and German with the occasional equivalent proverb in English, French, or Latin. 

In 1921, Helstone was co-founder of the Herrnhutter-Comité, an organisation for the interests of the Moravian Church congregation.

Death
Helstone died on 24 April 1927 at the age of 74.

Legacy 

In 1944, W.A. Leeuwin made a radio program about Helstone. The broadcast ended with the observation that there were no visible signs of his presence any more. 

In 1948, a monument was erected on the north-side of the Centrumkerk, because Helstone had been the organist of the church for many years.

In 1959, Trefossa wrote God zij met ons Suriname, a new national anthem for Suriname. Originally Trefossa used a melody by Helstone. The lyrics were accepted, however the national anthem uses the 1867 melody.

References

Bibliography

External links 
 Johannes Helstone at Digital Library for Dutch Literature (mainly in Dutch)
 

1853 births
1927 deaths
People from Brokopondo District
Surinamese composers
Surinamese educators
Surinamese male writers
Surinamese musicians
University of Music and Theatre Leipzig alumni
Writers in Sranan Tongo